Kimberly Anne Walker (June 19, 1968  – March 6, 2001) was an American film and television actress. One of her best known roles was that of Heather Chandler in the 1988 comedy Heathers. Walker's only starring role was in the 1995 independent drama film A Reason to Believe, where she played the character of Judith.

Biography 
Walker was born on June 19, 1968. Walker attended Grace Church School and Fiorello H. LaGuardia High School.

She died of a brain tumor at her Los Angeles home on March 6, 2001.

Filmography

References

External links

Actresses from New York City
American film actresses
American television actresses
Deaths from brain cancer in the United States
1968 births
2001 deaths
20th-century American actresses